Gabar Singh Negi VC (21 April 189510 March 1915) was a soldier in the British Indian Army during the First World War and a recipient of the Victoria Cross, the highest and most prestigious award for gallantry in the face of the enemy that can be awarded to British and Commonwealth forces.

Early life
Gabar Singh Negi, was born on 21 April 1895 at Manjaur village near Chamba, Tehri Garhwal State (present-day Tehri Garhwal district, Uttarakhand). The area is in the Himalayas and was part of the original Garhwal Kingdom, Uttarakhand. He joined the 2nd Battalion of the Garhwal Rifles, a regiment of the British Indian Army, in October 1913; the personnel of the regiment were mainly from the Garhwali people of Uttarakhand

First World War
On the outbreak of the First World War, the 39th Garhwal Rifles was among the regiments selected for the Indian Expeditionary Force A, destined for the Western Front in France. By October 1914, the regiment, as part of the 7th (Meerut) Division, was in the frontlines during the First Battle of Ypres and later in the Pas-de-Calais sector where it would remain until going into reserve at the end of that year.

In March 1915, the 7th Division was selected to be involved in the Battle of Neuve Chapelle, which called for an assault on the German lines at Neuve Chapelle. The 7th Division was to help force a gap for the Cavalry Corps to exploit. On 10 March 1915, during the battle, Negi's 2nd Battalion was attacking to the southwest of Neuve Chappelle; an artillery barrage that preceded the attack was not effective and the German trenches were well defended. Parties with bombs had to clear the trenches; one such party included Negi. When the commander of his party was killed, he took over, leading from the front as the party took control of the German trenches. He was later killed. His actions on 10 March led to him being posthumously awarded the Victoria Cross (VC). The VC, instituted in 1856, was the highest award for valour that could be bestowed on a soldier of the British Empire. The citation for his VC read as follows: 

Negi has no known grave; his name is recorded on the Neuve-Chapelle Memorial, as Gabar Singh Negi. His name was one of those included on the dome of the Memorial Gates in London, unveiled in 2002.

Victoria Cross
Negi's VC was sent to the India Office to be forwarded to his next of kin, Satoori Devi, his wife. The VC was acquired by his regiment which arranged for a replica to be sent to Devi. A letter of condolences from Queen Mary was also sent to Devi. The medal was a source of pride for Negi's widow, who would wear it until her death in 1981.

Legacy
Descendants of Negi have organised the Gabar Singh Negi Fair annually at Chamba in his memory, held every 20 or 21 April since 1925, depending on the Hindu calendar. His regiment, the Garhwal Rifles, have maintained a presence since 1971. A recruitment rally, stalls and army bands provide entertainment and many villagers, particularly the youths, attend the fair because of the drawcard of the recruitment rally.

See also
 Darwan Singh Negi, another World War I Victoria Cross recipient from Uttarakhand

Notes

References

External links
 
 
 Gabar Singh Negi: Story of First WW Victoria Cross recipient

Indian World War I recipients of the Victoria Cross
British Indian Army soldiers
Indian Army personnel killed in World War I
1890s births
1915 deaths
People from Tehri Garhwal district
Military personnel from Uttarakhand
Military personnel of British India